The Amalgamated Union of Building Trade Workers (AUBTW) was a British trade union.

History
The AUBTW was founded in 1921 when the Operative Society of Masons, Quarrymen and Allied Trades of England and Wales, the Operative Bricklayers' Society and the Manchester Unity of Operative Bricklayers' Society merged.  It was joined by the Building and Monumental Workers' Association of Scotland in 1942, the National Builders' Labourers' and Constructional Workers' Society in 1952, the National Society of Street Masons, Paviors and Road Makers in 1966 and the Amalgamated Slaters', Tilers' and Roofing Operatives' Society in 1969.

In 1971, the AUBTW merged with the Amalgamated Society of Woodworkers to form the Amalgamated Society of Woodworkers, Painters and Builders.

Election results
The union sponsored Labour Party candidates in several Parliamentary elections.

Leadership

General Secretaries
1921: George Hicks
1941: Luke Fawcett
1951: George Lowthian

Presidents
1921: George Waddell
1934: Luke Fawcett
1942: Harry Adams
1953: Harry Weaver

References

External links
Catalogue of the AUBTW archives, held at the Modern Records Centre, University of Warwick

Trade unions established in 1921
Trade unions disestablished in 1971
Defunct trade unions of the United Kingdom
1921 establishments in the United Kingdom
Building and construction trade unions
British builders
Trade unions based in London